Affinine is a monoterpenoid indole alkaloid which can be isolated from plants of the genus Tabernaemontana. Structurally it can be considered a member of the vobasine alkaloid family and may be synthesized from tryptophan. Limited pharmacological testing has indicated that it may be an effective inhibitor of both acetylcholinesterase and butyrylcholinesterase.

See also
 Affinisine

References

Acetylcholinesterase inhibitors
Alkaloids found in Apocynaceae